The 1947 Georgetown Hoyas football team was an American football team that represented Georgetown University during the 1947 college football season. In its 13th season under head coach Jack Hagerty, the team compiled a 3–4–1 record and outscored opponents by a total of 95 to 70. The team played its home games at Griffith Stadium in Washington, D.C.

Schedule

References

Georgetown
Georgetown Hoyas football seasons
Georgetown Hoyas football